The illegal drug trade in Peru includes the growing of coca and the shipment of cocaine to the United States. In an example of the balloon effect, dramatic falls in coca cultivation in the late 1990s saw cultivation move to Colombia.

Events 
In 2001 American Christian missionary Roni Bowers's plane was shot down by the Peruvian Air Force, in the belief it was carrying drugs.

In 2004 Fernando Zevallos, founder of airline Aero Continente, was added to the US list of drug kingpins. The Chilean government accused the airline's personnel of using their airplanes for trafficking drugs and subsequently grounded Aero Continente Chile in June 2002 and seized their assets.

See also
 Centro de Información y Educación para la Prevención del Abuso de Drogas

General:
 Crime in Peru
 Drug trafficking in Peru

References

Peru
Crime in Peru by type
Drugs in Peru
Peru
Peru